The  Danish national road network is a numbering system for roads in Denmark developed by the Danish Road Directorate (Vejdirektoratet).

The roads are numbered from 6 to 99 and 01 to 04 for ring roads with Danish national road status. There are currently 37 Danish national roads and 59 is currently the highest number. Signs are yellow with black numbers.

National roads

National ring roads

References